Fermín Holgado Guerediaga (born 17 May 1994) is an Argentine professional footballer who plays as a goalkeeper for CP San Cristóbal.

Career
Holgado had youth stints with Trenque Lauquen, Gimnasia y Esgrima and Arsenal de Sarandí. In 2015, after a stint with Central Córdoba, Holgado moved to Spanish football by signing with El Palo in the Tercera División. He stayed for the 2015–16 and 2016–17 campaigns in the third tier, making twenty-five appearances as they secured fifth and eighth place finishes. 2017 saw Holgado return to Argentina with Almirante Brown. Having not played in the 2017–18 season in Primera B Metropolitana, Holgado switched to Primera B Nacional's Olimpo. He made his debut on 16 September 2018 during a win over Ferro Carril Oeste.

In his sixth appearance for Olimpo, in November, Holgado was sent off during a draw away to former team Central Córdoba. July 2019 saw Holgado move to fellow second tier club Almagro. He remained for the shortened 2019–20, though didn't make a competitive appearance; appearing on the bench fourteen times across league and cup. In 2020, Holgado made a return to Europe with Andorran Primera Divisió side Sant Julià. He made his debut in a 2–1 win over Atlètic d'Escaldes on 16 December.

At the end of January 2022, Holgado moved to Spanish Tercera División RFEF club CP San Cristóbal.

Career statistics
.

References

External links

1994 births
Living people
Sportspeople from Buenos Aires Province
Argentine footballers
Association football goalkeepers
Argentine expatriate footballers
Expatriate footballers in Spain
Expatriate footballers in Andorra
Argentine expatriate sportspeople in Spain
Argentine expatriate sportspeople in Andorra
Tercera División players
Primera Nacional players
Primera Divisió players
Central Córdoba de Santiago del Estero footballers
CD El Palo players
Club Almirante Brown footballers
Olimpo footballers
Club Almagro players
UE Sant Julià players